RMIT's School of Economics, Finance and Marketing is an Australian tertiary education school within the College of Business at the Royal Melbourne Institute of Technology (RMIT University), located in Melbourne, Victoria. As per their website, the research performed at the RMIT's School of Economics, Finance and Marketing has a focus on business behaviour, economics and econometrics, corporate and digital related finances plus their governance, sports and social marketing and consumer culture.

See also
RMIT University

References

External links
School of Economics, Finance and Marketing

Economics, Finance and Marketing
Business schools in Australia
Banking schools
Economics schools